The Cambridge Quarterly is a literary journal. It often  publishes articles on cinema, music, painting, and sculpture. It also endows a prize for, and publishes, the best Cambridge University Finals dissertation each year.

The journal was founded by Harold Andrew Mason in 1966.

Notes

References
 The Cambridge Quarterly

Cambridge University academic journals
Literary magazines published in the United Kingdom
Magazines established in 1966
Quarterly magazines published in the United Kingdom
Mass media in Cambridge